Julien Brugnaut (born 17 November 1981) is a French former rugby union prop.

He was called up to the France squad for the 2008 Six Nations Championship. It was in this tournament that he made his France debut against Scotland on 3 February 2008 at Murrayfield.

References

External links
RBS 6 Nations profile
Munster Profile

French rugby union players
1981 births
Living people
Rugby union props
France international rugby union players
Montpellier Hérault Rugby players
Munster Rugby players
Racing 92 players
Sportspeople from Lille
Expatriate rugby union players in Ireland
French expatriate sportspeople in Ireland
French expatriate rugby union players
US Dax players
CA Brive players
CA Bordeaux-Bègles Gironde players